The Quincy Woman's Club (also known as the Old Washington Lodge No. 2) is a historic woman's club in Quincy, Florida, United States. It is located at 300 North Calhoun Street. On March 10, 1975, it was added to the U.S. National Register of Historic Places.

See also
List of Registered Historic Woman's Clubhouses in Florida

Gallery

References

External links

 Gadsden County listings at National Register of Historic Places
 Florida's Office of Cultural and Historical Programs
 Gadsden County listings
 Gadsden County markers

Buildings and structures in Gadsden County, Florida
Clubhouses on the National Register of Historic Places in Florida
Women's clubs in Florida
Women's club buildings in Florida
National Register of Historic Places in Gadsden County, Florida
1854 establishments in Florida